Limnophila rufibasis is a species of limoniid crane fly in the family Limoniidae.

References

Further reading

External links

 
 

Limoniidae
Articles created by Qbugbot